The World Scrabble Championship 2011 was held in the Hilton Hotel, Warsaw, Poland, from 12 October to 16 October 2011. The format was a 34-round preliminary tournament and a best-of-five final. The top two players after the preliminary tournament, Nigel Richards and Andrew Fisher, played a best-of-five final for the top prize and the title of World Scrabble Champion 2011. There were 114 places allocated to competitors from around the world, with 106 players eventually competing.

Results
The winner was Nigel Richards of New Zealand who defeated  Andrew Fisher of Australia with three games to two in the best-of-five finals. Richards set the record for being the first two-time World Champion. He repeated this success, winning for a third time in 2013.

Richards won the first game 489–422. Bingos from Fisher included BINGERS and INTERWAR. Bingos from Richards were zENAIDAS, ACEROLA and MOLTERs.

Fisher won the second game with 520–406. Fisher bingoed GONDELAY while Richards struggled with a rack AAAEIIS. Richards had the bingo SOSATIE but there was no available spot. Later in the game, he played RETARDS, which was then replied by Fisher's OUTSPAN. Towards the end of the game, Richards played INSULAR for 83 points, which was again replied, with NEEDIER for 81 points.

At the end of Game 2 of the best-of five finals, both players had 1 win.

Richards pulled one back in the third game, 464–359. He had 4 bingos: DAROGHAS (63), UNFANNEd (64), TOLARJEV (90) and PAROdIES (72) compared to Fisher's only bingo of BOUGHTEN for 67 points.

Game 4 went to Fisher with 562–420 despite him having racks such as  AAAABEE and AAAEEIO. Richards' ANGRIeST (70) was replied with JEEZ (81) and his EQUID (75) was immediately replied with TALLIED (79)

At the end of Game 4 of the finals, both players had 2 wins. It was an intense competition between the two.

The fifth game saw Richards take the title of World Champion, winning clearly with 476–333. It was a close game until Richards got OMNIFIED for 95 points, giving him a 100-point lead over Fisher. He then sealed the win with URAnITEs across four hooks for 88 points.

Final standings

FINALS:
Game 1: Richards 489 – Fisher 422
Game 2: Fisher 520 – Richards 406
Game 3: Richards 464 – Fisher 359
Game 4: Fisher 562 – Richards 420
Game 5: Richards 476 – Fisher 333

Missing tile incident
In a round seven game between Edward Martin and Chollapat Itthi-Aree, Martin discovered a tile (G) missing at the end of play. (Since players typically bag the letters from a laid-out 10-by-10 grid from which a missing letter would be obvious, it is not normally possible to start a game with an incorrect number of letters, although using a 9-by-11 grid by mistake could mask a missing tile). The tournament director ruled that the letter be replaced, and Martin won the game 402–401. This caused some embarrassment to Martin and hard feelings among the Thai contingent, and it was widely reported that Chollapat Itthi-Aree had suggested that Martin be strip searched, but another reporter states that Chollapat did not make such a suggestion.

References

2011
2011 in Polish sport
2010s in Warsaw